Guégan is a Breton surname. Notable people with the surname include:

Élodie Guégan (born 1985), French middle-distance runner
Hervé Guégan (born 1963), French footballer
Jean-Baptiste Guégan (born 1983), French singer
Marc-Adolphe Guégan (1891–1959), French journalist and poet
Olivier Guégan (born 1972), French footballer
Raymond Guégan (1921–2007), French cyclist

Surnames of Breton origin
Breton-language surnames